Samuel Magee (born 9 January 1990) is a retired Irish badminton player. He won the 2009 European Junior Championships in the boys' doubles event at Milan, Italy with his partner Sylvain Grosjean of France. Sam Magee was a bronze medalists at the European Games in the mixed doubles event with his sister Chloe Magee in 2015 Baku and 2019 Minsk, also in the men's doubles with his brother Joshua Magee in 2015.

Achievements

European Games 
Men's doubles

Mixed doubles

European Championships 
Mixed doubles

European Junior Championships 
Boys' doubles

BWF Grand Prix 
The BWF Grand Prix had two levels, the Grand Prix and Grand Prix Gold. It was a series of badminton tournaments sanctioned by the Badminton World Federation (BWF) and played between 2007 and 2017.

Mixed doubles

  BWF Grand Prix Gold tournament
  BWF Grand Prix tournament

BWF International Challenge/Series 
Men's doubles

Mixed doubles

  BWF International Challenge tournament
  BWF International Series tournament
  BWF Future Series tournament

References

External links 
 

1990 births
Living people
People from Raphoe
Sportspeople from County Donegal
Irish male badminton players
Badminton players at the 2015 European Games
Badminton players at the 2019 European Games
European Games bronze medalists for Ireland
European Games medalists in badminton